Blouberg (literally meaning blue mountain) can refer to:
 Bloubergstrand, a beach town near Cape Town named after the mountain
 Blouberg (range), a rocky range in Limpopo Province
 Blouberg Local Municipality, a municipality in Limpopo Province named after the range